Dmitriyevka is a rural locality (a village) in Kovarditskoye Rural Settlement, Muromsky District, Vladimir Oblast, Russia. The population was 10 as of 2010.

Geography 
Dmitriyevka is located 13 km northwest of Murom (the district's administrative centre) by road. Valovo is the nearest rural locality.

References 

Rural localities in Muromsky District
Muromsky Uyezd